Qarluq (also Romanized as Qārlūq; also known as Karlikh and Qārloq) is a village in Howmeh Rural District, in the Central District of Abhar County, Zanjan Province, Iran. At the 2006 census, its population was 186, in 37 families.

References 

Populated places in Abhar County